Go Bo Diddley is the second album by American rock and roll musician Bo Diddley, released in July 1959. The album was Bo's first studio album that included some material that hadn't been prereleased on singles, and his first LP for Checker Records. In 2003, Rolling Stone ranked it number 214 on its The 500 Greatest Albums of All Time, and 216 in a 2012 revised list.

Background
The B-side to the single "Hush Your Mouth", "Dearest Darling" was released June 1958 and also released on Bo Diddley's self-titled debut album. Bo's next single "Willie and Lillie" was released in November 1958 and then released on this album. Bo's next single "I'm Sorry"/"Oh Yea" was released in February 1959 and reached number 17 on Billboard magazine's Hot R&B Sides chart. The next single "Crackin' Up" b/w "The Great Grandfather" was released in May. Go Bo Diddley was released two months later in July. In November 1959, Bo released his most popular single "Say Man"/"The Clock Strikes Twelve" which became a crossover hit reaching number 20 on the Billboard Hot 100.

Four songs on the album were album-only tracks, including "You Don't Love Me (You Don't Care)", "Don't Let It Go," "Little Girl," and "Bo's Guitar."

Recording
The original recordings in mono format were recorded with an Ampex-350 tape recorder. The songs "You Don't Love Me (You Don't Care)" and "Little Girl" were from Bo's first session for Chess Records on March 2, 1955.

Track listing
All songs were written by Ellas McDaniel, with "I'm Sorry" made in collaboration with Alan Freed and Harvey Fuqua.

Side one
"Crackin' Up" – 2:41
"I'm Sorry" – 2:30
"Bo's Guitar" – 2:38
"Willie and Lillie" – 2:34
"You Don't Love Me (You Don't Care)" – 2:36
"Say Man" – 3:09

Side two
"The Great Grandfather" – 2:40
"Oh Yea" – 2:30
"Don't Let It Go" – 2:36
"Little Girl" – 2:35
"Dearest Darling" – 2:32
"The Clock Strikes Twelve" – 2:35

Personnel
Per liner notes
Bo Diddley – vocals, guitar; violin on "The Clock Strikes Twelve"
Peggy Jones – guitar, backing vocals
Jerome Green – co-lead vocals on "Say Man", maracas
Willie Dixon – bass
Clifton James – drums
Frank Kirkland – drums
Billy Boy Arnold  – harmonica on "You Don't Love Me (You Don't Care)" and "Little Girl"
Lafayette Leake – piano
Otis Spann – piano

Release history

References

1959 albums
Bo Diddley albums
Checker Records albums
Albums produced by Leonard Chess
Albums produced by Phil Chess
Albums produced by Bo Diddley